Mary Shirley, Countess Ferrers (c.1730 – 25 July 1807), formerly Mary Meredith, later Lady Frederick Campbell, was an English noblewoman.

Mary was the youngest daughter of Amos Meredith of Henbury, Cheshire, and his wife, the former Joanna Cholmondeley. Her brother, William, was an MP and became 3rd Baronet Meredith in 1752, on the death of his grandfather.

On 16 September 1752, she married Laurence Shirley, 4th Earl Ferrers. In 1758, the couple were legally separated, with Mary citing the earl's cruelty as the cause. He was widely believed to come from a family where mental illness was congenital, and in 1760 he was found guilty of murdering one of his servants, and was hanged at Tyburn in May 1760. At his execution he wore his wedding suit, claiming that his "unhappy conduct" was the result of "a forced marriage". There were no children from the marriage,

On 28 March 1769, Mary married Lord Frederick Campbell, a brother of the Duke of Argyll; they had two daughters. One of their daughters, Mary, married Captain Donald Campbell of Barbreck.

Lady Campbell was killed in a fire at their home, Combe Bank, Kent. Since the fire caused little damage to the house, it was speculated that Lady Campbell had suffered some kind of fit "with her head in the candle". Her second husband outlived her by nine years.

References

1730s births
1807 deaths
Deaths from fire
British countesses
Daughters of baronets
Accidental deaths in England